Opole cuisine is an umbrella term for all dishes with a specific regional identity belonging to the region of Opole. It is a subtype of Polish and German cuisine with many similarities to and signs of the influence of neighbouring cuisines.

List of Opole dishes

Pastry and baked goods

Anyżki - flat, oval aniseed biscuits
Chleb mleczny praszkowski (Praszków milk bread) - traditional, slightly sour tasting bread
Chrust, faworki (angel wings) - traditional sweet crisp pastry, deep-fried, sprinkled with powdered sugar
Buchty śląskie - unleavened dough pampuchy, traditionally served with berry kompot, powidła, pork, sauerkraut or sugar 
Hałwa sezamowa (sesame halva) - largely unflavoured, sesame based taste
Kołocz śląski - made from yeast dough with a sweet crumb topping
Jeż - cake with blackberry cream dollop
Kretowina - yeast dough cake with chocolate
Śliszki - bread rolls with poppy-seed filling
Szpyrek - biscuits with pork fat; light sweet taste

Soups
Germuszka, warmuszka, biermuszka - bread, cumin soup of thick texture
Ścierka opolska - thick flour-egg, sweet-sour tasting soup
Siemieniotka - bird seed soup
Śląski żur na maślance (Silesian buttermilk sour rye soup) - sour rye soup with buttermilk
Wodzionka - stale bread and fat with water or milk

Fish dishes
Harynki w cebulowej zołzie (herring in onion sauce) - lightly salted Baltic herring served with sweet-sour onion sauce; may be served with śmietana
Karp niemodliński (Niemodlin carp) - a slightly sweet-tasting carp

Pork and beef dishes

Żymlok opolski biały (white Opole żymlok) - kaszanka  from pork lung, heart or kidney
Krupniok śląski (Silesian krupniok) - kaszanka; generally with barley-groat stuffing
Krupnioki z Górek (Górki krupniok) - originated from Górki; a kaszanka, kasza with garlic
Leberwurst drobno mielony z Górek (liverwurst from Górki) - a liverwurst produced after pig slaughter, spiced with garlic and pepper
Opolska rolada wołowa (Opole beef rouladen) - a rouladen with baked beef; generally with pickled cucumber, bacon
Modziki - a pigeon meat based dish, generally served with fresh vegetables

Stews, vegetable and potato dishes

Ciapkapusta, pańczkraut, pańćkraut - potato, cabbage pureé dish
Pierogi postne ze Starych Kolni (Lent pierogi from Stare Kolnie) - originating from the village of Stare Kolnie; resembling a mid-sized cake, stuffed with groat kasza and potato 
Placki kartoflane (potato pancakes) - round, flat potato pancakes
Oberiba na gęsto - a thick, turnip-based salad
Biołe kluski - potato dumplings with a small depression in the centre
Śląskie niebo - bacon with kluski and sauce, generally with vegetables
Szałot śląski - potato, cucumber and onion salad

Puddings
Mołcka - a traditional Silesian Wigilia viand, made from dried fruit

See also
Silesian cuisine
Polish cuisine
List of Polish dishes

References

Polish cuisine
Opole Voivodeship
Silesia